Marty Smith (November 26, 1956 – April 27, 2020) was an American professional motocross racer. He competed in the AMA Motocross Championships from 1974 to 1981, most prominently as a member of the Honda factory racing team with whom he won three AMA National Motocross championships. With his long hair and Southern California surfer looks, he was a popular figure among race fans.

Motocross career
Born in San Diego, California, Smith first made a name for himself on the motocross scene by winning the inaugural AMA 125cc National Motocross Championship in 1974 and followed that up with another 125cc title in 1975. That same year, he won the 1975 125cc U.S. Grand Prix of Motocross, and finished second in the 250cc AMA Supercross series. Though he didn't win a title in 1976, he again won the 125cc U.S. Grand Prix of Motocross and placed fourth in the 125cc World Championship, the highest finish for an American in the world championships at the time. Smith was runner-up to Bob Hannah in the 1976 125cc national championship. In 1977, Smith recorded his final AMA title, defeating his long-time rival Bob Hannah in the last race of the season to win the 500cc AMA National Motocross Championship. A serious crash at the Houston Supercross in 1978 left Smith with a broken hip. He finished third in the 500cc National Motocross Championship that year, but never recaptured his championship speed. He raced for Honda for one more year before switching to Suzuki for the 1980 and 1981 seasons. He retired at the end of the 1981 season.

Smith stayed involved in motorcycling. In 1991 he teamed up with Larry Roeseler and Ted Hunnicutt Jr. to win the famous Baja 1000 desert race on a Kawasaki. Smith was inducted into the AMA Motorcycle Hall of Fame in 2000.

Death 
Smith and his wife Nancy were killed in a dune buggy rollover accident at the Imperial Sand Dunes in Southern California on April 27, 2020. He was 63.

References

External links 
 American Motorcyclist, January 1976, Vol. 30, No. 1, ISSN 0277-9358

1956 births
2020 deaths
Motorcycle racers from San Diego
American motocross riders
AMA Motocross Championship National Champions
Road incident deaths in California